Święcica may refer to the following places:
Święcica, Lublin Voivodeship (east Poland)
Święcica, Sandomierz County in Świętokrzyskie Voivodeship (south-central Poland)
Święcica, Staszów County in Świętokrzyskie Voivodeship (south-central Poland)
Święcica, former name of Wola Klasztorna in Kozienice County, Masovian Voivodeship.